Merulanella is a genus of isopods within the family Armadillidae.  

First described in 1895, currently, there are at least seven described species of Merulanella:

This genus of Isopods is becoming popular as pets in the Isopod and exotic pet keeping hobby, particularly for the intense coloration displayed by multiple species. Many of these species are currently not identified; cultures such as the "Ember Bee" can be seen denoted simply as Merulanella sp. by hobbyists and vendors, indicating the scientific identification is unknown.

Species

References 

Isopoda
Taxa described in 1895